Fuson is an unincorporated community in Wright County, in the U.S. state of Missouri. The community is located on Missouri Route Z, approximately five miles north of Hartville.

History
A post office called Fuson was established in 1888, and remained in operation until 1923. The community has the name of T. B. Fuson, a country doctor.

References

Unincorporated communities in Wright County, Missouri
Unincorporated communities in Missouri